Sueviota lachneri, the Lachner's dwarfgoby, is a species of fish in the family Gobiidae. found in the Maldives.

Entymology
The fish is named for Ernest A. Lachner of USNM.

References

Randall, J.E. and M. Goren, 1993. A review of the gobioid fishes of the Maldives. Ichthyol. Bull. J.L.B. Smith Inst. Ichthyol. (58):1-37, 5 pls.

lachneri
Taxa named by Richard Winterbottom
Taxa named by Douglass F. Hoese
Fish described in 1988